Marimayam is an Indian Malayalam language sitcom television serial airing on Mazhavil Manorama since 5 November 2011. Marimayam comedians enact satirical sketches describing the typical scenarios observed at government institutions and societal trials faced by the common man. The show stars Manikandan Pattambi, Vinod Kovoor, Sneha Sreekumar, Niyas Backer, Riyas Narmakala, Mani Shornur and Salim Hasan in lead roles.

The show had crossover episodes twice; in 2016 and 2021 with Thatteem Mutteem, a family comedy sitcom series broadcast over the weekend on the same channel. The titles of the special episodes were like a combination of the titles of both series; "Marithatteem Mayammutteem" and "Thatteem Mayam Mutteem Mayam" in 2016 and 2021 respectively. All the special episodes were a backdrop to Onam celebrations.

Plot summary 
The comedians represent satirical sketches describing the encounters the common man faces while visiting government institutions.

Cast

Main 
 Manikandan Pattambi as Sathyaseelan
 Niyas Backer as Koya/Sheethalan
 Riyas Narmakala as Manmadan
 Vinod Kovoor as Moidu
 Sneha Sreekumar as Mandodari/Suhara
 Mani Shornur as Sugathan
 Salim Hasan as Pyarijathan
 Unni Raja as Unni

Recurring 
 Meenakshi Raveendran as Meera/Kingini
 Anagha Maria Varghese
 Mintu Maria Vincent as Sugandhi
 Parvathy Raveendran
 Sanuja

Former 
 Rachana Narayanankutty as Valsala
 Manju Pathrose as Shyamala
 S. P. Sreekumar as Lolithan
 Sidhartha Siva as Swayamvaran
 Anoop Chandran as Narayana Pisharody
 V. P. Khalid as Sumesh (deceased)
 Manju Vineesh
 Shibila
 Hareesh Kanaran

Awards 
Marimayam is the only Malayalam television show to win the 'Best Comedy Show' awards at Kerala State Television Awards for five consecutive years in a row.The biggest speciality of this show is that in all episodes it comes up with a promising content relating the social issues in a very realistic and humorous manner.

References

Malayalam-language television shows
Mazhavil Manorama original programming